Grizzlys Wolfsburg  are a professional ice hockey club of the German professional ice hockey league Deutsche Eishockey Liga. They play their games at Eisarena in Wolfsburg.

History
Wolfsburg earned their first promotion to the DEL in 2004. However after one season, they were relegated back to 2.Bundesliga due to their arena not meeting league standards. In 2006, Eisarena Wolfsburg opened, allowing the club to return to the DEL, where they have remained since.

The 2010–11 season marked the first time the club advanced to the league championship series, but they were swept by Eisbären Berlin.

Honors

Winners
Deutscher Eishockey-Pokal: 2009

Runners-up
Deutsche Eishockey Liga Championship:  2011, 2016, 2017

Season records

Players

Current roster

References

External links
 

Deutsche Eishockey Liga teams
Ice hockey teams in Germany
Ice hockey clubs established in 1975
Wolfsburg
1975 establishments in West Germany
Grizzly bears in popular culture